Milazzo is a surname. Notable people with the surname include:

Gaspar Milazzo (1887–1930), Italian-born American mobster
Ivo Milazzo (born 1947), Italian comic book artist
Jane Margaret Triche Milazzo (born 1957), American judge
Peter Milazzo (born 1996), Canadian rugby union player
Richard Milazzo, American art critic, curator, publisher, independent scholar and poet
Silvio Milazzo (1903–1982), Italian politician
Vincenzo Milazzo (born 1956), Italian painter